The 2012–13 EHF Cup was the 32nd edition of the EHF Cup and the first edition since the merger of the EHF Cup with the EHF Cup Winners' Cup. The EHF Cup final four tournament was played in Nantes, France, between 18 and 19 May 2013.

Qualification stage

Round 1
The table below shows the results of the first round. Teams listed first played at home during the first leg and away during the second leg. Some teams agreed to play both matches in one venue (see: Notes). Highlighted teams qualified into the second round.

|}

Notes
Note 1: The second leg was played in Perm, Russia, with Tiraspol being the official hosts.
Note 2: The second leg was played in Brest, Belarus, with Conservano being the official hosts.
Note 3: The second leg was played in Balatonfüred, Hungary, with Kehra being the official hosts.
Note 4: The first leg was played in Mielec, Poland, with Nilüfer Belediyespor being the official hosts.
Note 5: The second leg was played in Kumanovo, Macedonia, with Dobrudja being the official hosts.
Note 6: The first leg was played in Kolding, Denmark, with London GD being the official hosts.

Round 2
The table below shows the results of the second round. Teams listed first played at home during the first leg and away during the second leg. Some teams agreed to play both matches in one venue (see: Notes). Highlighted teams qualified into the third round.

|}

Notes
Note 7: The first leg was played in Argos, Greece, with Madeira being the official hosts.
Note 8: The second leg was played in Perm, Russia, with Wacker Thun being the official hosts.
Note 9: The second leg was played in Lisbon, Portugal, with Loacker Südtirol being the official hosts.
Note 10: The second leg was played in Vordingborg, Denmark, with Lovćen being the official hosts.
Note 11: The first leg was played in Poltava, Ukraine, with Siscia being the official hosts.
Note 12: The first leg was played in Maribor, Slovenia, with Kópavogs being the official hosts.
Note 13: The second leg was played in Zaporizhzhia, Ukraine, with Haukar Hafnarfjördur being the official hosts.
Note 14: The second leg was played in Bacău, Romania, with Ystads IF being the official hosts.

Round 3
The table below shows the results of the third round. Teams listed first played at home during the first leg and away during the second leg. Some teams agreed to play both matches in one venue (see: Notes). Highlighted teams qualified into the group stage. The first legs were played on 23–25 November, and the second legs were played on 1 and 2 December 2012.

|}

Note 15: The second leg was played in Bacău, Romania, with Maccabi Srugo Rishon Lezion being the official hosts.

Group stage

Draw and format
The draw of the EHF Cup group phase was carried out on Thursday 6 December 2012 in Belgrade, Serbia. The teams were positioned into four pots, with the country protection rule applied: two clubs from the same country may not face each other in the same group. As is standard in EHF club competitions, the seeding is calculated on the basis of the three most recent seasons. Consequently, the results of the seasons 2011–12, 2010–11 and 2009–10 was considered to determine the seeding of the teams for the 2012–13 season. As there was the EHF Cup as well as the EHF Cup Winners' Cup parallel in these last three seasons, the results of both competitions of these seasons were added and then divided by two in order to get the points for the seeding for the 2012–13 season.

The group stage features 16 teams, which were allocated four groups of four. In each group, teams play against each other home-and-away in a round-robin format. The matchdays are 9–10 February, 16–17 February, 23–24 February, 9–10 March, 16–17 March, and 23–24 March 2013. The top two teams from each group qualify for the quarter-finals, which are scheduled in April 2013.

If Nantes, as the organiser of the Final 4 tournament, win their group or finish among top three second ranked teams, they will receive a direct qualification to the Final 4 tournament. In that case only four group winners and two best second ranked team will qualify for the quarter-finals. If the French side wins their group then the other three group winners and the three best second ranked team will qualify for the quarter-finals. If Nantes finish among the top three second ranked teams, the quarter-finals will consist of four group winners and two best second ranked teams. If Nantes finish as the worst second ranked team, they will have to play the quarter-final match. Should the French club rank on the third or fourth position in their group, they will be out of the competition, but they will still organize the Final 4 tournament.

If two or more teams are equal on points on completion of the group matches, the following criteria are applied to determine the rankings (in descending order):

number of points in matches of all teams directly involved;
goal difference in matches of all teams directly involved;
greater number of plus goals in matches of all teams directly involved;
goal difference in all matches of the group;
greater number of plus goals in all matches of the group;

If no ranking can be determined, a decision shall be obtained by drawing lots. Lots shall be drawn by the EHF, if possible in the presence of a responsible of each club.

Group A

Group B

Group C

Group D

Ranking of the second-placed teams
The ranking of the second-placed teams was carried out on the basis of  the team's results in the group stage, against the first and third placed teams. The results against teams which finished last in the group stage did not count in the ranking system.

Knockout stage

Quarter-finals

Draw and format
Because the hosts of the Final 4 tournament, Nantes, finished the group stage among the top three second-placed teams, they have clinched the direct ticket to the final weekend and decided that only three quarter-finals will be played for the remaining spots in the final tournament. The draw of the EHF Cup quarter-finals was carried out on Tuesday 26 March 2013 at the EHF headquarters in Vienna, Austria. Six teams were positioned into two pots with the country protection rule not applied: two clubs from the same country could face each other in the quarter-finals. However, teams from the same group of the group phase cannot face each other. The first pot contained the four group winners and the second pot contained the top two second-placed teams. In the quarter-finals, teams will play against each other over two legs on a home-and-away basis, the team drawn first will play the first leg on the home court.

|}

Final four

Top goalscorers

See also
2012–13 EHF Champions League
2012–13 EHF Challenge Cup

References
General

Specific

Cup
Cup
EHF Cup seasons